Benin competed at the 2012 Summer Olympics in London, United Kingdom from 27 July to 12 August 2012. This was the nation's tenth appearance at the Olympics, except the 1976 Summer Olympics in Montreal because of the African boycott.

Five athletes from Benin were selected to the team, 4 men and 1 woman, to compete only in athletics, boxing, judo, and swimming. Among the five athletes, track runner Mathieu Gnanligo competed only at his second consecutive Olympics. Judoka Jacob Gnahoui became the nation's first male flag bearer at the opening ceremony since 1984. Benin, however, has yet to win its first Olympic medal.

Athletics

Athletes from Benin have so far achieved qualifying standards in the following athletics events (up to a maximum of 3 athletes in each event at the 'A' Standard, and 1 at the 'B' Standard):

Men

Women

Key
Note–Ranks given for track events are within the athlete's heat only
Q = Qualified for the next round
q = Qualified for the next round as a fastest loser or, in field events, by position without achieving the qualifying target
NR = National record
N/A = Round not applicable for the event
Bye = Athlete not required to compete in round

Boxing

Benin has qualified a boxer for the following event.

Men

Judo

Benin has had 1 judoka invited.

Swimming

Benin has gained a "Universality place" from the FINA.

Men

References

External links 
  
 

Nations at the 2012 Summer Olympics
2012
Olympics